2001 World Masters Athletics Championships is the fourteenth in a series of World Masters Athletics Outdoor Championships
that took place in Brisbane, Australia, from 1 to 14 July 2001.

The main venue was Queen Elizabeth II Sports Complex, comprising Queensland Sport and Athletics Centre (called "ANZ Stadium" at that time) and the newly rebuilt State Athletics Facility.

Some stadia events were held at University of Queensland Sport Athletics Centre.

Non-stadia venues included St Lucia Golf Course for Cross Country

and University of Queensland for Road Walks. South Bank Parklands hosted a 5K Fun Run/Walk before the start of competitions,

and was the site for start and finish of the Marathon, which followed an inner city route and the Brisbane River.

This edition of masters athletics Championships had a minimum age limit of 35 years for women and 40 years for men.

The governing body of this series was formally renamed from World Association of Veteran Athletes (WAVA) to World Masters Athletics (WMA) during General Assembly at this Championships on 11 July,

though the WAVA name was still used throughout the competitions and WAVA was prominent in the logo.

This Championships was organized by WAVA/WMA in coordination with a Local Organising Committee (LOC): David Lloyd, Kerry Watson, Jacey Octigan, Allan Bell.

In addition to a full range of track and field events,

non-stadia events included 8K Cross Country, 10K Race Walk (women), 20K Race Walk (men), and Marathon.

Results
Past Championships results are archived at WMA.

Additional archives are available from Masters Athletics,

from European Masters Athletics

as a searchable pdf,

and from Museum of Masters Track & Field

as a searchable pdf

and as National Masters News pdf newsletters.

Several masters world records were set at this Championships. World records for 2001 are from the list of World Records in the National Masters News August newsletter unless otherwise noted.

Women

Men

References

External links

World Masters Athletics Championships
World Masters Athletics Championships
International athletics competitions hosted by Australia
2001
Masters athletics (track and field) records